Alvin Jeschke is a retired Czechoslovak slalom canoeist who competed from the late 1940s to the mid-1950s. He won a bronze medal in the folding K-1 team event at the 1949 ICF Canoe Slalom World Championships in Geneva.

References

External links 
 Alvin JESCHKE at CanoeSlalom.net

Czechoslovak male canoeists
Possibly living people
Year of birth missing
Medalists at the ICF Canoe Slalom World Championships